Voices in Love is a 1958 album by The Four Freshmen. It was issued by Capitol Records, and re-released in 1998 as a twin album together with Love Lost.

Track listing
 “I'm Always Chasing Rainbows” (Harry Carroll, Joseph McCarty)
 “There Is No Greater Love” (Isham Jones, Marty Symes)
 “Moonlight” (Milton Kellem, Tony Iavello)
 “It Could Happen to You” (Johnny Burke, Jimmy Van Heusen)
 “Out of Nowhere” (Johnny Green, Edward Heyman)
 “In the Still of the Night” (Cole Porter)
 “I'll Remember April” (Gene de Paul, Patricia Johnston, Don Raye)
 “While You Are Gone” (Lucky Thompson)
 “Warm” (Sidney Jacobson, Jim Krondes)
 “Time Was" (Duermé)” (Miguel Prado, Gabriel Luna, Bob Russell)
 “You're All I See” (Russell Faith)
 “I Heard You Cried Last Night (And So Did I)” (Ted Grouya, Jerrie Kruger)

Personnel 
 Don Barbour – vocals, guitar
 Ross Barbour – vocals, drums
 Bob Flanigan – vocals, trombone, bass
 Ken Albers – vocals, trumpet, bass
 Al Hendrickson - guitar
 Geoff Clarkson - piano
 Red Mitchell - bass
 Shelly Manne - drums

Arranged and conducted by Dick Reynolds

References

1958 albums
The Four Freshmen albums
Capitol Records albums